Holo may refer to:

 Holo, the theme, formerly-recommended by Google, for the design of Android apps, introduced with Android version 4.0
 Hölö, a village in Södertälje Municipality, Sweden
 Hoklo people (also spelled Hō-ló or Holo), a Han ethnic group whose traditional homeland is in South China
Holo or Hoklo the varieties in the Min Nan family of Chinese spoken by the Hoklo people
 Théodore Holo (b. 1948), Beninese politician and foreign minister of Benin from 1991 to 1992
 Holo-Man, fictional American superhero who starred in a 1978 single-issue comic book about holography, The Amazing Adventures of Holo-Man
 Holo (Spice and Wolf), the main female character of the Spice and Wolf light novel series
 Holo-Me, is the name of the character customisation process in the video game Elite: Dangerous
 HOLO card, a public transit smart card used in Honolulu, Hawaiʻi

See also
 
 
 Holos (disambiguation)
 Holocaust
 Holocene
 Holodomor
 Holography (disambiguation)
 Holon (disambiguation)
 Holotype, biological type
 Holism

 Rolo
 Solo (disambiguation)